WBPZ (1230 AM) is a radio station licensed to Lock Haven, Pennsylvania, United States.  The station is owned by Schlesinger Communications LLC and was purchased in October 2010. It was also the oldest and westernmost radio affiliate of the Philadelphia Phillies until 2008. In late 2019, AM 1230 WBPZ began broadcasting on 96.9 FM as well as AM 1230.

History
WBPZ began broadcasting as a Mutual affiliate with 250 watts of power in February 1947.

References

External links

BPZ
Radio stations established in 1947
1947 establishments in Pennsylvania
Classic hits radio stations in the United States